Michael Burden, FAHA, (born 14 March 1960) is an Australian musicologist, working in the United Kingdom. He was elected a Corresponding Fellow of the Australian Academy of the Humanities in 2018.

Life
Born in Adelaide, South Australia, he was educated at Pulteney Grammar School and the University of Adelaide; his took his PhD at the University of Edinburgh. He is currently Fellow in Music, Dean and Chattels Fellow at New College, Oxford; he is also director of New Chamber Opera, and Professor of Opera Studies in the Faculty of Music, University of Oxford. In 2016, he became one of the patrons of the St Peter’s Cathedral Music Foundation, which supports the music of St Peter's Cathedral, Adelaide.

Academic Service
He served as Chair of the Board of the University of Oxford's music faculty from 2015 to 2018. From 2007 until 2015, he was a Visitor to Oxford's Ashmolean Museum; he is also curator of the Music Faculty's collection of portraits. In the academic year 2009-2010, he was one of the University's four Pro-Proctors (deputies to the Proctors).

From 2009 to 2013, he was the president of The British Society for Eighteenth-Century Studies, preceded by two years as Vice-President, and followed by two years as Past President. He has also served on the Council of the Royal Musical Association and is on the steering committee of the Besterman Centre for the Enlightenment (see Voltaire Foundation), a member of the Project Team for Ballad Operas Online, a trustee of both Répertoire International des Sources Musicales United Kingdom, and the Gerald Coke Handel Foundation; and on the advisory panel of The Oxford Centre for Life Writing.

Research
His research is on the stage music of Purcell, and on aspects of dance and theatre in the 17th, 18th, and 19th centuries, and includes a catalogue of Metastasio’s operas as performed in London, an edition of Le Ballet de la Nuit: Rothschild B1/16/6 with Jennifer Thorp, and a biographical account of Regina Mingotti’s years in London. He is currently completing a book on the staging of opera in London 1660 to 1860. Much of his recent research has been directed towards the London Stage Project,  in particular to soon-to-be released The London Stage Calendar 1800-1844. .

With Jennifer Thorp, he organises the annual Oxford Dance Symposium, which takes place each year at New College.

His collection of mainly 18th century English theatre books, music, and other ephemera is gradually being accepted in a series of gifts to the Rare Books collection by the Barr Smith Library at the University of Adelaide.

Editorial Boards, Editing
He is on the editorial boards of the Journal for Eighteenth-Century Studies, and the series 'Studies in British Musical Cultures' published by Clemson University Press. He has been Consultant Editor for numbers of the journal Early Music ('Music in Purcell's London I' (1995); 'Music in Purcell's London II'; (1996), Metastasio (1998)) and Guest Editor for numbers of the journals Journal for Eighteenth-Century Studies - 'Farinelli' (2004) - and with Jennifer Thorp for Music in Art (2010) and The Court Historian (2010). 

He is on the editorial committees for the collected music editions of the works of Alessandro Stradella and John Eccles. His own editions include 
 Benedetto Marcello, Il pianto e il riso delle quattro stagioni, Recent Researches in Music of the Baroque Era, 115 (Wisconsin: A-R Editions, 2002). 
 Henry Purcell, The Fairy-Queen (London: Edition Eulenburg, 2009); the first complete edition of both the text and the music.
 William Walton, The Bear, William Walton Collected Edition, 2 (Oxford University Press, 2010).
 Benedetto Marcello, Il Trionfo della Poesia, e della Musica nel celebrasi la morte, le esaltazione, e la inconronazione di Maria Sempore Virgine assunta in Cielo. Recent Researches in Music of the Baroque Era, 191 (Wisconsin: A-R Editions, 2016). 
 Francesco Cavalli, Erismena, Collected Cavalli Edition (Bärenreiter Verlag, Kassel, 2018). Performed New College, Oxford, July 2010. Performed by Yale Baroque Opera Project on 1 and 2 May 2015. http://ybop.yale.edu
 John Eccles, Revels on the Peace of Ryswick, Recent Researches in Music of the Baroque Era, 209 (Wisconsin: A-R Editions, 2019).

Personal
One of his interests outside music is architectural history, particularly the history of architecture and town planning in Adelaide, South Australia. His first book was a photographic exploration of demolished buildings of that city. Published as Lost Adelaide by Oxford University Press in 1983, it remains a classic text in the documentation of Adelaide's lost architectural heritage.

See also
Oxford Dance Symposium
New Chamber Opera

Sources

(2018), Who's Who 2018 (London: A. & C. Black)
New College, Oxford. Michael Burden
Faculty of Music, University of Oxford 
The British Society for Eighteenth-Century Studies
University of Oxford. Dr. Michael Burden
RISM UK. 
Besterman Centre for the Enlightenment. 
Oxford Centre for Life-Writing. 
Ballad Operas Online. 

Fellows of New College, Oxford
Living people
1960 births
University of Adelaide alumni
Alumni of the University of Edinburgh
Academics of the University of Oxford
Music directors (opera)
Australian musicologists
21st-century conductors (music)